Surakarta, known colloquially as Solo, is a city in Central Java, Indonesia. The 44 km2 (16.2 sq mi) city adjoins Karanganyar Regency and Boyolali Regency to the north, Karanganyar Regency and Sukoharjo Regency to the east and west, and Sukoharjo Regency to the south. On the eastern side of Solo lies Solo River (Bengawan Solo). Its built-up area, consisting of Surakarta City and 59 districts spread over seven regencies ("Greater Solo Area", formerly Special Region of Surakarta), was home to 3,649,254 inhabitants as of 2010 census, around half million of which reside in the city proper.

Surakarta is the birthplace of the current President of Indonesia, Joko Widodo. He served as Mayor of Surakarta from 2005 to 2012.

History

Hominid habitation in the region of Surakarta is evidenced from roughly one million years ago, the age of the "Java Man" skeleton found 80 kilometers upstream. Another famous early hominid from this area is called "Solo Man".

The Surakarta area was part of the Mataram Kingdom and in this time a village called Wulayu seems to have already existed in or around the present-day city of Surakarta, as evidenced by a ferry charter issued by Balitung in A.D. 904. The Majapahit empire renewed this ferry charter in 1358.

By the 18th century, the village had acquired the name of Sala. This name is said to be derived from the sala tree. As the Javanese pronunciation "Sala" ([sɔlɔ]) was considered difficult to pronounce by the Dutch, the name later morphed into "Solo" ([solo]).

In 1745, on the basis of astrological calculations and Dutch commercial interest, Surakarta was chosen to be the new capital of the Mataram Sultanate which was on the verge of becoming a vassal state of the Dutch East India Company. The formal name is derived from the previous capital Kartasura. The official court history claims that Surakarta originally stood on a lake, which was drained by the favor of the mythical queen of the southern sea, Kanjeng Ratu Kidul.

In the ensuing colonial era, the kingdom of Mataram was divided into the Surakarta Sunanate (northern court) and the Yogyakarta Sultanate (southern court). Surakarta ruled by hereditary monarchs, who were given the unique Javanese cultural title Susuhunan. Since both Surakarta and Yogyakarta had become vassal states of the Dutch, traditional court arts, notably gamelan, were developed to demonstrate cultural power instead of developing military power.

Pakubuwono X 
Perhaps the most significant ruler of the 20th century was Pakubuwono X. His relationship with the Dutch, his large family, and his popularity contributed to perhaps the largest funeral procession that ever occurred in Surakarta.  He had spent a large amount of money on the Royal Graveyard at Imogiri, both the main sections of the graveyard and the new section that he was buried in.  In the era just prior to independence Surakarta had European, Chinese, and Arab quarters.

Struggle for independence
After hearing the proclamation of Indonesian Independence, Pakubuwono XII declared Surakarta a part of the Republic of Indonesia. Because of this support, President Sukarno declared Surakarta a Special Region with the Susuhunan, Pakubuwono XII, continuing as governor. This terminology was also used for the Special Region of Yogyakarta, which continues to be legally governed by its sultan to this day.
However, unlike Yogyakarta, Surakarta had intense, organized resistance to the continuation of the monarchy. In October 1945, a republican movement was established in Surakarta led by Tan Malaka, a member of the Indonesian Communist Party. 
  
On October 17, the vizier of Surakarta, KRMH Sosrodiningrat V (a member of the BPUPK), was kidnapped. The new vizier, KRMT Yudonagoro, and 9 other court officials were also kidnapped by the same movement in March 1946, including heir to the viziership KRMTH Wuryaningrat. 

In response, Prime Minister of Indonesia Sutan Syahrir met with Wuryaningrat and other Surakarta leaders in May and agreed to abolish the established government entirely. 

On June 16, 1946, the Surakarta "special region" was abolished and replaced with a regency (kabupaten), administered by a republican government outside the control of the Susuhunan and his court. This event is commemorated as the birthday of the city of Surakarta.

On June 26, Prime Minister Sutan Syahrir was kidnapped in Surakarta by a rebel movement led by Major General Soedarsono, the commander of the 3rd division. President Sukarno was angry at this kidnapping and on July 1, 1946, 14 communist leaders including Tan Malaka were arrested by Indonesian police on Sukarno's instructions. However, Soedarsono freed the rebel leaders immediately. Sukarno asked the local military commander in Surakarta, Lieutenant Colonel Suharto to arrest Major General Soedarsono and the rebel group. 

Suharto refused to follow this command unless it was given directly by the Military Chief of Staff, General Soedirman. Sukarno was angry at this rejection of his commanding authority, and called Suharto a stubborn (koppig) officer.

Suharto pretended to support the rebellion and persuaded Soedarsono and his group to stay at his headquarters at Wiyoro, Surakarta for their own safety. Later that night he persuaded Soedarsono to meet President Sukarno at his palace the next morning. Suharto secretly informed the presidential guard troops about Soedarsono's plan on the next morning. On July 3, 1946, Soedarsono and his group were arrested by the presidential guard near the palace. Prime Minister Syahrir was released unharmed. Several months later, Maj. Gen. Soedarsono and his group were pardoned and released from prison.
 
However, this did not halt the ascendancy of the Communist Party in Surakarta. In November 1946, the communists kidnapped the regent and vice-regent and seized power for themselves, a coup quickly legitimated after the fact by Sukarno. In 1947, Amir Sjarifuddin appointed Wikana, a communist, as Surakarta's military governor.

In December 1948, the Dutch attacked and occupied the cities of Yogyakarta and Surakarta as part of Operation Kraai. The Indonesian Army, led by General Soedirman, started a guerrilla war from surrounding areas. The Dutch declared that the Republic had been destroyed and no longer existed. To disprove this, the Indonesian army conducted large-scale raids into the cities of Yogyakarta and Surakarta, called Serangan Oemoem. On August 7, 1949, Indonesian troops led by Slamet Riyadi managed to defeat the Dutch troops and occupied the city for several hours. To   
commemorate this event, the main street of the city of Surakarta was renamed Brigadier General Slamet Riyadi Street. 
 
Surakarta remained under communist control until October 1965. Local government was unclear about how to proceed after the 30 September Movement and went about business as usual. As a result, Suharto's forces entered Surakarta without resistance, mobilized local youth paramilitaries, and indiscriminately slaughtered the entire local government.

Administrative divisions 

After Surakarta became a city, it was divided into five districts (kecamatan), each led by a camat, and subdivided into 51 kelurahan, each led by a lurah. The districts of Surakarta City are tabulated below with their areas and their populations at the 2010 Census, together with the latest official estimates (for mid 2019). The table also includes the number of administrative villages (urban kelurahan) in each district and its administrative centre:
 Kecamatan Pasar Kliwon (Postal code: 57110): 9 kelurahan
 Kecamatan Jebres (Postal code: 57120): 11 kelurahan
 Kecamatan Banjarsari (Postal code: 57130): 13 kelurahan
 Kecamatan Laweyan (also spelled Lawiyan, Postal code: 57140): 11 kelurahan
 Kecamatan Serengan (Postal code: 57150): 7 kelurahan

Greater Surakarta

Surakarta as a dense core city in Central Java, and its second city, spills considerably into neighboring regencies. Surakarta City and its surrounding regencies, Karanganyar, Sragen, Wonogiri, Sukoharjo, Klaten, and Boyolali, are collectively called the ex-Surakarta Residency  (Dutch: Residentie Soerakarta).

Though a traffic study quotes the population as 1,158,000 as of 2008, this reflects only the very core, as the city affects entire neighboring regencies by significantly driving up overall population densities in Sukoharjo Regency and Klaten Regency over the already dense countryside. Furthermore, the government of Indonesia officially defines a broader region as Surakarta's extended metropolitan zone, with the acronym Subosukawonosraten as the city and 6 surrounding regencies, which reflects a broader planning region, though not a core metropolitan area as some of its regencies are not particularly suburbanized. Both the metropolitan area and extended areas border Yogyakarta's metropolitan area, while only the extended metropolitan area borders Kedungsapur or Greater Semarang.

Hydrogeology 
The water sources for Surakarta are in the valley of Merapi, a total of 19 locations, with a capacity of 3,404 L/second (899.2 U.S. gal/sec). The average source water height is 800–1,200 m (2624.7 ft to 3937 ft) above sea level. In 1890–1927 there were only 12 wells in Surakarta. Today, underground water wells in 23 locations produce about 45 L/second (11.9 U.S. gal/sec).

In March 2006, Surakarta's state water company (PDAM) had a production capacity of 865.02 L/second (228.5 U.S. gal/sec): from Cokrotulung, Klaten, 27 km (16.8 mi) from Surakarta, 387 L/s (102.2 U.S. gal/sec); and from 26 deep wells, with a total capacity of 478.02 L/second (126.3 U.S. gal/sec). The total reservoir capacity is 9,140 m3 (414,533 U.S. gala) nd can serve 55,22% of the population.

Climate 
Under the Köppen climate classification, Surakarta features a tropical monsoon climate. The city has a lengthy wet season spanning from October through May, and a relatively short dry season covering the remaining four months (June through September). On average Surakarta receives just under 2200 mm (86.6 in) of rainfall annually, with its wettest months being December, January, and February. As is common in areas featuring a tropical monsoon climate, temperatures are relatively consistent throughout the year. Surakarta's average temperature is roughly 30 °C every month (86 °F).

Demography 

One of the earliest censuses held in Surakarta Residency (Residentie Soerakarta) was in 1885. At that time, with an area of about 5,677 km2 (2191.9 sq mi), there were 1,053,985 people in Surakarta Residency, including 2,694 Europeans and 7,543 Indonesian-Chinese. The area, 130 times the current area of Surakarta, had a population density of 186 people/km2 (480/sq mi). The capital of the residency itself (roughly the size of the City of Solo proper) in 1880 had 124,041 people living in it.

According to the 2009 estimate, there were 245,043 males and 283,159 females (a sex ratio of 86.54) in Surakarta. 119,951 of the population were 14 years or younger, 376,180 were between 15 and 64, and 32,071 were above 65. The number of households was 142,627 and the average number of household members was 3.7. The population growth in the last 10 years was about 0.565% per year.

The labor force of Solo in 2009 was 275,546, of whom 246,768 were working, while 28,778 were seeking work. Another 148,254 people aged 15 and above were not in the labor force. Based on employment numbers, the most common work in Solo was worker/paid employee (112,336), followed by self-employee (56,112), self-employee assisted by temporary employee (32,769), unpaid employee (20,193), self-employee assisted by permanent employee (14,880), freelance employee in non-agricultural work (10,241), and freelance employee in agricultural work (237). Based on the industry, most people in Solo worked in trade (106,426), services (59,780), manufacturing (42,065), communication (16,815), construction (9,217), financing (9,157), or agriculture (2,608), and the rest in mining, electricity, gas, and water companies (700).

The mean working week in Solo was 47.04 hours (47.74 for men and 46.13 for women), and 212,262 people worked more than 35 hours per week compared to 34,506 who worked less than that.

Education 
According to 2009 statistics, 242,070 people above 15 in the city had finished high school, while 86,890 had only finished junior high school, and 94,840 were still in school or had only finished elementary school. The percentage of high-school graduates was the highest of the cities and regencies in Central Java.

According to the statistics of Data Pokok Pendidikan (Dapodik), in the 2010/2011 school year, there were 68,153 students and 853 schools in Surakarta. There are two big universities possessing more than 20.000 students: Sebelas Maret University (UNS) and Muhammadiyah University of Surakarta (UMS), both are recognised as among Indonesia's 50 best universities according to the Directorate of Higher Education, Ministry of Education RI. There is also arts concentrated university Art Institute of Surakarta (ISI), religious studies State Islamic Institute (IAIN Surakarta). There are around 52 private universities and colleges such as STIKES Muhammadiyah, Universitas Tunas Pembangunan, Universitas Slamet Riyadi, Universitas Surakarta, Universitas Setia Budi, etc.

Economy 

The per capita GDP of Surakarta in 2009 was 16,813,058.62 IDR, the fourth highest in Central Java after Kudus, Cilacap, and Semarang. The living standard in 2009 was 723,000 IDR. The Consumer price index in January 2011 was 119.44.

Religion

On the 14th of November, 2022, President Widodo and his Emirati counterpart, Sheikh Mohamed bin Zayed Al Nahyan, inaugurated the Sheikh Zayed Grand Mosque in the city. Built at a cost of $20 million, it is a smaller replica of the grand mosque in Abu Dhabi, and is named in honour of the UAE's founder, Sheikh Zayed bin Sultan Al Nahyan.

Sports 
Surakarta has a long sport history and tradition. In 1923 Solo already had a football club, one of the earliest clubs in Indonesia (at that time still the Dutch Indies), called Persis Solo. Persis Solo was a giant club in the Dutch Indies and still exists, but is past its heyday. During the Perserikatan tournament, Persis became seven-time champion. Currently it plays in the Liga 1 Indonesia. Other than Persis, several clubs have existed in Solo: Arseto, Pelita Solo, Persijatim Solo FC, and lastly Solo FC played in the Indonesian Premier League in 2011. Both clubs that still exist, Persis and Solo FC, have made Manahan Stadium their home ground. Manahan Stadium is one of the best sports stadiums in Central Java, with more than 25,000 seats, and has several times hosted national and international matches. It was recently the venue for the AFC Champions Cup 2007, the final venue of the Indonesian Cup 2010, and the opening venue for the Indonesian Premiere League on January 15, 2011.

Surakarta is also home to the West Bandits Solo of the Indonesian Basketball League. They play their home games in the Sritex Arena.

Disabled sports

Surakarta is the first to host National Paralympic Week in 1957 and hosted several of the subsequent games. As a result, Surakarta has sport facilities sufficient for holding international disabled sports games.

In 1986, Surakarta hosted the 4th FESPIC Games, making the games the first in Indonesian para-sport history in which international disabled sports games were held. The city is also the host city of the 2011 ASEAN Para Games, instead of Jakarta and Palembang, where the main games were held, as well as the 2022 ASEAN Para Games where the original host, Vietnam, only held the 2021 Southeast Asian Games due to COVID-19 crisis.

Transportation

Air

Adisumarmo International Airport (IATA code: SOC) has direct flights to Kuala Lumpur by Malaysia Airlines and during the hajj season, Saudi Arabia, as well as regular flights to Jakarta by Garuda Indonesia, Sriwijaya Air, Lion Air and Citilink. The airport is located 14 km (8.7 mi) north of the city. In 2009 Adisumarmo had 2,060 outbound domestic flights and 616 outbound international flights.

Rail
Solo Balapan is the largest station in Surakarta, and is the junction between Yogyakarta (westward), Semarang (northward), and Surabaya (eastward), while Purwosari is the junction located west of Solo Balapan, and has a connection to Wonogiri (southward). There are several direct lines to other cities, such as Jakarta, Bandung, Surabaya, Semarang, Ngawi and Malang. For regional traffic, a commuter train KRL Commuterline Yogyakarta–Solo connects Surakarta and Yogyakarta.

On 26 July 2011 the Bathara Kresna Rail Bus has been launched to serve – route, but for the moment only Purwosari-Sukoharjo trackage was ready due to there are 99 bridges should be strengthen between Sukoharjo-Wonogiri. Until April 2012, Surakarta-Wonogiri railbus is still in a big question mark due to the 12 tons railbuses are considered too heavy for existing railroad track that only has the capacity of accommodating 10-ton vehicles, furthermore PT KAI have proposed a fare between Rp30,000 ($3.27) and Rp40,000 ($4.36) per passenger, while Surakarta administration wants tickets to be priced much lower between Rp5,000 ($0.54) and Rp7,000 ($0,76).

In 2019, Adisumarmo Airport Rail Link began operation, linking Solo Balapan Station to a station inside Adisumarmo International Airport complex.

Road

Tirtonadi Terminal is the largest bus terminal in Surakarta. Surakarta is situated on Indonesian National Route 15, which connects it to Yogyakarta and Waru (Sidoarjo). Semarang–Solo Toll Road connects the city with provincial capital Semarang. In 2009 the total extent of roadways in the city was 705.34 km: 13.15 km state road, 16.33 km province road, and 675.86 km local road. The number of bus companies was 23, and the total number of buses operating was 1,115 intra-provincial buses and 1,107 inter-provincial.

In 2010, the government of Surakarta launched a new bus service named Batik Solo Trans (BST), which resembles TransJakarta bus rapid transit service. As of 2017, it has only three routes. A single trip costs Rp.3000, Rp.1500 for students. A special ticket for the trip from or to the airport costs Rp.7000.

Tourism

One main tourist attraction of Surakarta is the Keraton Surakarta, the palace of Susuhunan Pakubuwono, also the Princely Javanese court of Mangkunegaran. Pasar Gede market is often visited by tourists, mostly for its unique architecture and fame as the biggest traditional market in the Solo area. The Pasar Klewer is famous for its batiks in all prices and qualities, while the Pasar Triwindhu located near Mangkunegaran palace specialises in antiques. Taman Sriwedari is a popular local entertainment park featuring a children's playground, dangdut music performance and Wayang Wong traditional Javanese dance performance almost every night. Near the park is Radyapustaka Museum, one of the oldest museums in Indonesia, with a collection of Javanese cultural artefacts. The traditional batik village of Laweyan and Kampung Batik Kauman, located in the southwest part of the city and the city centre respectively, are famous for producing fine quality Javanese batik.

Within Surakarta tourists can also use the Jaladara old steam train which was launched on in September 2009 for 5.6 km connecting Purwosari Station and Solo Kota Station. In 2011 there were 60 trips and in 2012 will be 80 trips.

People from Surakarta

Agung Setyabudi, football player
Basuki, actor and comedian
Diah Permatasari, actress and model
Didi Kempot, singer
F. X. Hadi Rudyatmo, former mayor of Surakarta
Fred van der Poel, Dutch footballer
Gesang, singer-songwriter
Icuk Sugiarto, former badminton player
Joko Suprianto, former badminton player
Joko Widodo, former Mayor of Surakarta, Governor of Jakarta and the current President of Indonesia
Pakubuwono X, 9th monarch of Surakarta Sunanate, one of National Hero of Indonesia
Rio Haryanto, Indonesia's first Formula One driver
Rudy Gunawan, former badminton player
Sapardi Djoko Damono, poet
Siti Hartinah, former First Lady of Indonesia
Suryo Agung Wibowo, sprinter
Waldjinah, singer
Widji Thukul, poet
Wynne Prakusya, former tennis player

Sister cities

 Montana, Bulgaria.
 Bilbao, Spain
 Algiers, Algeria

See also

 List of metropolitan areas in Indonesia
 Transition to the New Order

References

Further reading
 Majeed, Rushda. "The City With a Short Fuse." Foreign Policy. September 2012.
 Majeed, Rushda. "Defusing a Volatile City, Igniting Reforms: Joko Widodo and Surakarta, Indonesia, 2005-2011." Innovations for Successful Societies. Princeton University. Published July 2012.
 Miksic, John N. (general ed.), et al. (2006)  Karaton Surakarta. A look into the court of Surakarta Hadiningrat, central Java (First published: 'By the will of His Serene Highness Paku Buwono XII'. Surakarta: Yayasan Pawiyatan Kabudayan Karaton Surakarta, 2004)  Marshall Cavendish Editions Singapore  
 Soeharto, G. Dwipayana dan Ramadhan K.H. "Ucapan, Pikiran dan Tindakan Saya". 1988. PT Citra Lamtoro Gung.
 Miksic, John N. (general ed.), et al. (2006)  Karaton Surakarta. A look into the court of Surakarta Hadiningrat, central Java (First published: 'By the will of His Serene Highness Paku Buwono XII'. Surakarta: Yayasan Pawiyatan Kabudayan Karaton Surakarta, 2004)  Marshall Cavendish Editions Singapore  
 Soeharto, G. Dwipayana dan Ramadhan K.H. "Ucapan, Pikiran dan Tindakan Saya". 1988. PT Citra Lamtoro Gung.
 Paku Buwono XII (Sunan of Surakarta), A. Mutholi'in, "Karaton Surakarta", Yayasan Pawiyatan Kabudayan Karaton Surakarta, 2004
 Nancy K. Florida, Javanese literature in Surakarta manuscripts / Vol. 1 Introduction and manuscripts of the Karaton Surakarta, Cornell University, Ithaca, N.Y. Southeast Asia Program (SEAP), 1993.
 Nancy K. Florida, Javanese literature in Surakarta manuscripts / Vol. 2 Manuscripts of the Mangkunagaran Palace, Cornell University Ithaca, NY : Southeast Asia Program (SEAP), 2000.
 Nancy K. Florida, "Writing the past, inscribing the future: history as prophesy in colonial Java", Duke University Press, 1995
 Richard Anderson Sutton, "Traditions of gamelan music in Java: musical pluralism and regional identity", CUP Archive, 1991
 Clara Brakel-Papenhuijzen, "Classical Javanese dance: the Surakarta tradition and its terminology", KITLV Press, 1995
 The domestication of desire: Women, wealth, and modernity in Java (1998) Brenner, Suzanne April.  Princeton, N.J.: Princeton University Press.
 Keraton and Kumpeni: Surakarta and Yogyakarta, 1830–1870 (1994) Houben, V. J. H..  Leiden: KITLV Press.
 Prelude to revolution: Palaces and politics in Surakarta, 1912–1942 (1987) Larson, George D..  Dordrecht, Holland and Providence, R.I., U.S.A.: Foris Publications.
 Solo in the new order: Language and hierarchy in an Indonesian city (1986) Siegel, James T..  Princeton, N.J.: Princeton University Press.
 Pakubuwono's keraton of Surakarta: Short guide to Surakarta's grandeur : the palace of the Susuhunans Pakubuwono (1980) No contributors listed.  Jakarta: Proyek Pengembangan Sarana Wisata Budaya Jakarta.
 Miftah Sanaji, "Wisata Kuliner Makanan Daerah Khas Solo", Gramedia 2009, 
 "Ekspedisi Bengawan Solo", Laporan Jurnalistik Kompas, Kompas 2009, 
 Linda Carolina Brotodjojo, "Jajanan Kaki Lima Khas Solo", Gramedia 2008, 
 Izharry Agusjaya Moenzir, "Gesang", Gramedia 2010,

External links

 
 Official website of the government of Surakarta
 Solo City General Forum – Visitors' Guide and many pictures.
 Military History Centre – "Serangan Oemoem" (August 7, 1949).
 JalanSolo.com – Jalan Solo – the Spirit of JAVA
Interactive map, information on places of interest and accommodations
 Solo Flooring Craft Industry  - Solo Handcraft Flooring Industry
 Solo Business Directory
 
 

 
Solo River